Diego González (died 11 January 1587) was a Roman Catholic prelate who served as Bishop of Almería (1572–1587).

Biography
On 9 June 1572, Diego González was selected by the King of Spain and confirmed by Pope Gregory XIII as Bishop of Almería. He served as Bishop of Almería until his death on 11 January 1587.

References 

1587 deaths
16th-century Roman Catholic bishops in Spain
Bishops appointed by Pope Gregory XIII